The Every Boy  is the debut novel by American author and filmmaker Dana Adam Shapiro.

The author Dana Adam Shapiro produced and co-directed Murderball, the Academy Award nominated documentary about quadriplegic rugby players. He is a former senior editor at Spin and a contributor to The New York Times Magazine and other publications. With Plan B Entertainment, he is set to write and direct a movie based on The Every Boy.

Plot introduction
In this debut novel, a fifteen-year-old boy dies mysteriously, leaving behind a ledger filled with his darkly comic confessions.

Film, TV or theatrical adaptations 
The Every Boy is currently in development for film adaptation with Plan B Entertainment.

Footnotes

External links
bookreporter.com
voidmagazine.com
filmstew.com
theage.com.au
Dana Adam Shapiro on IMDB 
Variety article on film development of The Every Boy.

2005 American novels
2005 debut novels